Keys Hill is a hill about  high located at the head of Shearwater Glacier,  west-southwest of the summit of Mount Bird in northwestern Ross Island, Antarctica. It was named by the New Zealand Geographic Board in 2000 after Gordon Keys, a leader of long term New Zealand Antarctic Programme atmospheric research, 1985–95.

References

Hills of Ross Island